Spall are fragments of a material that are broken off a larger solid body. It can be produced by a variety of mechanisms, including as a result of projectile impact, corrosion, weathering, cavitation, or excessive rolling pressure (as in a ball bearing).  Spalling and spallation both describe the process of surface failure in which spall is shed.

The terms spall, spalling, and spallation have been adopted by particle physicists; in neutron scattering instruments, neutrons are generated by bombarding a uranium (or other) target with a stream of atoms. The neutrons that are ejected from the target are known as "spall".

Mechanical spalling
Mechanical spalling occurs at high stress contact points, for example, in a ball bearing. Spalling occurs in preference to brinelling where the maximal shear stress occurs not at the surface, but just below, shearing the spall off.

One of the simplest forms of mechanical spalling is plate impact, in which two waves of compression are reflected on the free-surfaces of the plates and then interact to generate a region of high tensile stress inside one of the plates.

Spalling can also occur as an effect of cavitation, where fluids are subjected to localized low pressures that cause vapour bubbles to form, typically in pumps, water turbines, vessel propellers, and even piping under some conditions. When such bubbles collapse, a localized high pressure can cause spalling on adjacent surfaces.

Anti-tank warfare

In anti-tank warfare, spalling through mechanical stress is an intended effect of high-explosive squash head (HESH) anti-tank shells and many other munitions which may not be powerful enough to pierce the armour of a target. The relatively soft warhead, containing or made of plastic explosive, flattens against the armour plating on tanks and other armoured fighting vehicles (AFVs) and explodes, creating a shock wave that travels through the armour as a compression wave and is reflected at the free surface as a tensile wave breaking (tensile stress/strain fracture) the metal on the inside. The resulting spall is dangerous to crew and equipment, and may result in a partial or complete disablement of a vehicle and/or its crew. Many AFVs are equipped with spall liners inside their armour for protection.

A kinetic energy penetrator, if it can defeat the armour, generally causes spalling within the target as well, which helps to destroy or disable the vehicle and its crew.

An early example of anti-tank weapon intentionally designed to cause spallation instead of penetration is the wz. 35 anti-tank rifle.

Spalling in mechanical weathering

Spalling is a common mechanism of rock weathering, and occurs at the surface of a rock when there are large shear stresses under the surface. This form of mechanical weathering can be caused by freezing and thawing, unloading, thermal expansion and contraction, or salt deposition.

Unloading
Unloading is the release of pressure due to the removal of an overburden. When the pressure is reduced rapidly, the rapid expansion of the rock causes high surface stress and spalling.

Freeze–thaw weathering
Freeze–thaw weathering is caused by moisture freezing inside cracks in rock. Upon freezing its volume expands, causing large forces which cracks spall off the outer surface. As this cycle repeats the outer surface repeatedly undergoes spalling, resulting in weathering.

Some stone and masonry surfaces used as building surfaces will absorb moisture at their surface. If exposed to severe freezing conditions, the surface may flake off due to the expansion of the water. This effect can also be seen in terracotta surfaces (even if glazed) if there is an entrance for water at the edges.

Exfoliation

Exfoliation (or onion skin weathering) is the gradual removing of spall due to the cyclic increase and decrease in the temperature of the surface layers of the rock. Rocks do not conduct heat well, so when they are exposed to extreme heat, the outermost layer becomes much hotter than the rock underneath causing differential thermal expansion. This differential expansion causes sub-surface shear stress, in turn causing spalling. Extreme temperature change, such as forest fires, can also cause spalling of rock. This mechanism of weathering causes the outer surface of the rock to fall off in thin fragments, sheets or flakes, hence the name exfoliation or onion skin weathering.

Salt spalling
Salt spalling is a specific type of weathering which occurs in porous building materials, such as brick, natural stone, tiles and concrete. Dissolved salt is carried through the material in water and crystallizes inside the material near the surface as the water evaporates. As the salt crystals expand this builds up shear stresses which break away spall from the surface.

Some engineers believe that porous building materials can be protected against salt spalling by treatment with penetrating sealants which are hydrophobic (water repellent) and will penetrate deeply enough to keep water with dissolved salts well away from the surface.  Great care and expert advice must be consulted, however, to ensure that any coating is compatible with the substrate in terms of breathability (ability to allow the release of vapours from inside while preventing water intrusion), or other serious problems can be created.  

Chimneys show spalling damage before other portions of buildings because they are more exposed to the elements.

Corrosion
In corrosion, spalling occurs when a substance (metal or concrete) sheds tiny particles of corrosion products as the corrosion reaction progresses. Although they are not soluble or permeable, these corrosion products do not adhere to the parent material's surface to form a barrier to further corrosion, as happens in passivation. Spallation happens as the result of a large volume change during the reaction.

In the case of actinide metals (most notably the depleted uranium used in some types of ammunition), the material expands so strongly upon exposure to air that a fine layer of oxide is forcibly expelled from the surface. A slowly oxidised plug of metallic uranium can sometimes resemble an onion subjected to desquamation. The main hazard however arises from the pyrophoric character of actinide metals which can spontaneously ignite when their specific area is high. This property, along with the inherent toxicity and (for some to a lesser extent) radioactivity of these elements, make them dangerous to handle in metallic form under air. Therefore, they are often handled under an inert atmosphere (nitrogen or argon) inside an anaerobic glovebox.

Spalling in refractory concrete
There are two drivers for spalling of concrete: thermal strain caused by rapid heating and internal pressures due to the removal of water. Being able to predict the outcome of different heating rates on thermal stresses and internal pressure during water removal is particularly important to industry and other concrete structures.

Explosive spalling events of refractory concrete can result in serious problems. If an explosive spalling occurs, projectiles of reasonable mass (1–10 kg) can be thrust violently over many metres, which will have safety implications and render the refractory structure unfit for service. Repairs will then be required resulting in significant costs to industry.

See also 
 Behind-armour debris
 Frangibility
 Friability
 Misznay–Schardin effect
 Ore dressing
 Pyrophoricity
 Runit Island
 Whipple shield

References

External links

 Midwest Chimney Safety Council 
 Masonry Heater Association of North America

Ammunition
Concrete
Corrosion
Vehicle armour
Materials degradation